Lviv's Old Town is the historic centre of the city of Lviv, within the Lviv Oblast (province) in Ukraine, recognized as a State Historic-Architectural Sanctuary in 1975.

UNESCO
Since 1998, the United Nations Educational, Scientific and Cultural Organization (UNESCO) has listed Lviv's historic center as part of "World Heritage". On 5 December 1998, during the 22nd Session of the World Heritage Committee in Kyoto (Japan), Lviv was added to the UNESCO World Heritage List. UNESCO gave the following statement explaining its selection:

List of featured landmarks

Beside the listed items of three major areas, there are some 2,007 other historical landmarks within the Old City's area, 214 of which are considered national landmarks.
Pidzamche (Sub-castle)
 High Castle and Sub-castle neighborhood, the original center of the city also containing the neighborhood of Old Market Square, the castle was preserved in ruins, however the general area of the city is better known for its name
 Church of St.Nicholas, the family church of the Halychyna (Ruthenian) kings
 Church of St.Paraskeva-Praxedia (Good Friday), contains 1740 inconostasis of the church by Fedor Senkovych
 Church of St.Onuphrius and Basilian Monastery, contains artworks of Lazar Paslavsky and Modest Sosenko
 Church of St.John the Baptist (today – Museum of Lviv Ancient relics), the church was dedicated to the Hungarian wife of King Leo, Constance, a daughter of King Béla IV
 Church of Snowy Mary (today – Our Lady of Perpetual Help Church), the church of German colonists of the city
Seredmistia (Middletown)
 Ensemble of Rynok (Market) Square, contains Lviv Rathaus (center) and square perimeter of housing surrounding it
 Ensemble of the Church of Assumption, beside the church, includes Chapel of Three Prelates and Korniakt's Tower
 Ensemble of Armenian Church, beside the church, includes a belfry, a column with statue of St.Christopher, a building of former Armenian bank, a palace of the Armenian archbishops, Benedictine Armenian convent
 Ensemble of Latin Metropolitan Cathedral, beside the cathedral of St. Mary includes Boim Chapel and Kampians' Chapel
 Ensemble of Bernardine Monastery (now  Church of St. Andrew), includes cathedral, monastery, belfry, rotunda, decorative colon, and defensive walls
 Ensemble of the Jesuit Cathedral and Collegium
 Ensemble of Dominican Church (now the Church of the Holy Eucharist), beside the church includes monastery and belfry
 City's fortifications include the City's Arsenal, the Gunpowder Tower, the Turners and Ropemakers' Tower, the Royal Arsenal, a bastion of lower defense wall
 House of the "Dnister" Insurance Company
Church of St. Yura (St. George), the Dragonfighter
 St. George’s Cathedral, beside the cathedral includes the Metropolitan's Palace, capitular houses, belfry, and fence with two gates (Market's and City's)
Old Town landmarks that are not part of the World Heritage Site
 Church of Carmelites, the Barefooted (today – Church of St. Michael)
 Church and Nunnery of Carmelites, the Barefooted (today – Church of Purification)
 Church of Poor Clares (today – Museum of Sacral Baroque Sculpture)
 Church of St.Martin (today – Baptist Church)
 Church of Transfiguration
 Church of St.Casimir
 Lviv Theatre of Opera and Ballet
 Potocki Palace, Lviv, currently a residence of the President of Ukraine
 Commodity Stock Exchange

See also
 List of historic reserves in Ukraine

References

External links
  Description at the website of the Institute of History of the NANU
 Mayor of Lviv Sadovy wants the sanctuary to be discontinued (ZIK May 17, 2010)
 The city council is unaware of the sanctuary (ZIK February 1, 2011)
 Information on a book about the sanctuary published in 1979
 Description of the World Heritage site

Historic districts
Historic sites in Ukraine
Landmarks in Lviv
Protected areas of Ukraine
Protected areas established in 1975
Tourist attractions in Lviv
World Heritage Sites in Ukraine